Talhotblond is a 2012 American television film directed by Courteney Cox. It is based on an Internet love triangle that resulted in a real-life murder.  It is based on the 2009 Barbara Schroeder documentary of the same name.

Cast
Garret Dillahunt as Thomas Montgomery
Brando Eaton as Brian
Laura San Giacomo as Carol Montgomery
Molly Hagan as Beth Brooks

See also
Talhotblond (2009 film), documentary about the same subject.

References

External links 

2012 television films
2012 films
American television films